Municipal Stadium is a multi-purpose stadium in Sherbrooke, Quebec, Canada.  It hosted three soccer games during the 1976 Summer Olympics.  It is currently used mostly for football and it holds 4,000 people.

References
1976 Summer Olympics official report. Volume 2. pp. 208–11.
1976 Summer Olympics official report. Volume 3. pp. 279–87.

Soccer venues in Quebec
Sports venues in Sherbrooke
Venues of the 1976 Summer Olympics
Olympic football venues
Multi-purpose stadiums in Quebec